Ştefan Tampa (born 16 March 1943) is a Romanian wrestler. He competed in the men's freestyle welterweight at the 1964 Summer Olympics.

References

1943 births
Living people
Romanian male sport wrestlers
Olympic wrestlers of Romania
Wrestlers at the 1964 Summer Olympics
Place of birth missing (living people)